Dobrá is a village and municipality in the Trebišov District in the Košice Region of eastern Slovakia.

History
In historical records the village was first mentioned in 1323.

Geography
The village lies at an altitude of 112 metres and covers an area of 8.32 km².
It has a population of about 415 people.

Ethnicity
The village is about 86% Hungarian, 9% Slovak and 5% Gypsy in ethnicity.

Facilities
The village has a public library and a football pitch.

Genealogical resources

The records for genealogical research are available at the state archive "Statny Archiv in Kosice, Slovakia"

 Roman Catholic church records (births/marriages/deaths): 1848-1904 (parish B)
 Greek Catholic church records (births/marriages/deaths): 1795-1905 (parish A)

See also
 List of municipalities and towns in Slovakia

External links
https://web.archive.org/web/20071116010355/http://www.statistics.sk/mosmis/eng/run.html
Surnames of living people in Dobra

Villages and municipalities in Trebišov District
Zemplín (region)